O Homem que Virou Suco (English: The Man That Was Turned Into Juice) is a 1980 Brazilian drama film written and directed by João Batista de Andrade.

Cast
 José Dumont as Deraldo / Severino
 Célia Maracajá as Maria
 Denoy de Oliveira
 Freire Barros as Ceará
 Renato Master as Joseph Losey
 Rafael de Carvalho
 Ruthinéa de Moraes
 Aldo Bueno
 Dominguinhos as himself
 Ruth Escobar
 Vital Farias
 Luís Alberto Pereira
 Pedro Sertanejo

Reception
It won the Golden Prize at the 12th Moscow International Film Festival.

References

External links
 

1980 films
1980 drama films
Brazilian drama films
1980s Portuguese-language films